Cotton Pickers may refer to:

 The Cotton Pickers, an 1876 oil painting by Winslow Homer
 The Cotton-Pickers, a 1926 novel by B. Traven
 McKinney's Cotton Pickers, an American jazz band
 Morrilton Cotton Pickers, a 19th-century American minor league baseball team